Our Long Road Home is the fourth studio album and third independent album by American alternative metal band Taproot and was released on September 16, 2008. The album is Taproot's first independent release since 1999's Upon Us and was released through Velvet Hammer, the label founded by the eponymous management company that has worked with bands such as System of a Down, Deftones, Alice in Chains. This album also marks the drop of producer Toby Wright who had worked on the band's previous two studio releases.

The album's lead single would be "Wherever I Stand"; although, "You're Not Home Tonight" has received radio play as well. The title Our Long Road Home suits the band's roots in Ann Arbor area in which it was recorded. The track "It's Natural" includes a female vocalist, which is a first for the band. "Stethoscope" and "Hand That Holds True" are the OLRH Teaser #1 clips that Taproot released on YouTube; these were followed by "Path Less Taken."

The album debuted at number 65 on the Billboard 200, with first week sales of 7,700. It is the final album to feature original drummer Jarred Montague, who announced his departure from the band only a week after the album's release.

Production
"Budget cuts and political shifts," according to Taproot vocalist Stephen Richards, cost them their label support with Atlantic. This led the band to "try doing something different" and release Our Long Road Home independently. The album was recorded at The Loft, a barn converted into a recording studio in Saline, Michigan. Richards, living 10 minutes away from the studio, considered this convenient due to various band members now having families and wanting to stay close to them. He noted "For the first time, instead of being thousands of miles away and being forced to be creative, we were at home, inspired by the things we know and love." Guitarist Mike DeWolf wrote one of the songs and Richards played drums during the recording process. Our Long Road Home was originally scheduled for release on August 5 but was pushed back due to mixing problems and the addition of two "heavier" songs.

The band has since noted the mixed fan reception toward the progressive sound of Our Long Road Home. In March 2010, when discussing the band's upcoming Plead the Fifth, guitarist Mike DeWolf stated:

"I think it threw a lot of fans for a loop. But at the time, we were willing to lose some people to gain some more. In general, I guess ... I don't know. But we're definitely getting back to it. I think a lot of people appreciated the progressive nature of what we were trying to do but at the same time, a lot of people are just fucking meatheads and only want heaviness. I guess some bands are pretty good at sticking to one thing and working that their entire career. Say ... AC/DC. But that wasn't us."

Critical reception

Tim Grierson from About.com called the album "a consistently tuneful collection", praising the different styles of 90s rock the band adopts for songs that contain autobiographical lyrics about their experience with the music industry that Grierson considered as being "compelling stuff." He concluded that "[A]s its title suggests, Our Long Road Home captures a band that once was lost but is now finding its way at last." Mark Keresman of AllMusic noted how the band took "a more melodic, radio-friendly approach" to their sound while retaining their unique genre style, concluding that "Fans of Taproot's earlier discs may be a little confused, but Our Long Road Home finds them heading towards an identity all their own." A writer for the Seattle Post-Intelligencer felt the record was scattershot with the track listing going back and forth between "melodic hard rock the band made its bones on and something more akin to boring, sappy Christian rock." It concludes with: "There are a few strong moments, to be sure ("The Path Less Taken," "Take It" and "You're Not Home Tonight"), but most of the songs offer more of the same old riffs and post-grunge sentiments of failed relationships."

Track listing

References

External links
 Official site

2008 albums
Taproot (band) albums
Albums produced by Ulrich Wild